Higinio Nicolás Morínigo Martínez (January 11, 1897 – January 27, 1983) was a military officer, politician and Paraguayan dictator.  He participated in the Chaco War (1932–1935) as a prominent officer of the Paraguayan Army. After the war he was appointed Chief of the Cabinet of the Ministry of War and Navy during the presidency of Félix Paiva.  He was Minister of the Interior between January and August 1939, then appointed Minister of War and Navy and promoted to brigadier general in May 1940 during the government of José Félix Estigarribia.  When the latter died in a plane crash a few months later. Morínigo became President of Paraguay, a position he would hold until 1948.

Early life and military career
Morínigo was born in 1897 in Paraguarí, Paraguay, to a merchant family of mixed European and Guarani descent. He was fluent in the Spanish and Guaraní languages. Little else is known of his early life.

He attended military college and entered the Paraguayan Army in 1922. He participated in the Chaco War and was appointed the Army's Chief of Staff in 1936. Morínigo gained fame in Paraguay during the February Revolution of 1936 by heading an expedition to the site of the Battle of Cerro Corá to retrieve the remains of Francisco Solano López. President José Félix Estigarribia, himself a Chaco War hero and supporter of the Liberal Party, promoted Morínigo to general and appointed him as Minister of War on May 2, 1940.

After Estigarribia's unexpected death in an airplane crash on September 7, Morínigo was chosen by the army and Liberal ministers as interim President for the two-month period leading to new Presidential elections.

Dictatorship
On September 30, 1940, after growing disagreements with the President, the Liberal ministers resigned from the government. On October 16 Morínigo announced that the Presidential elections would be postponed for two years. Soon afterward he announced a policy of "discipline, hierarchy and order" (disciplina, jerarquia, y orden) and stated that persons who spread subversive ideas would be "subject to confinement".

On November 30, Morínigo banned all political parties and assumed dictatorial powers under a state of siege. In a midday radio address announcing these measures, Morínigo declared, "The people and the Army from this moment will be under a single command." In his self-coup and subsequent rule, he was greatly assisted by the 1940 Constitution, a severely authoritarian document written by the Liberals and Estigarribia that gave the president sweeping executive powers.

To strengthen his authority, on February 4, 1941, Morínigo removed the influential Colonel Peredes from the post of interior minister. On April 17, 1941, he suppressed a febrerista uprising by supporters of the February Revolution.

On April 25, 1942, he banned the Liberal Party, accusing them of conspiring with the Bolivians and exiled Party's leaders. Morínigo's only remaining supporters were radicals from the Colorado Party and the Army. During his dictatorship he faced widespread resistance, including general strikes and military revolts, but he survived by maintaining the loyalty of the Paraguayan Army, which received 45% of the country's budget.

Morínigo relied on the right-wing Colorado faction Guion Rojo (the "Red Banner"), led by Juan Natalico Gonzalez, as a paramilitary police force to intimidate febreristas and Liberals. Opposition newspapers were shut down and publishers exiled.

Morínigo finally held presidential elections on February 15, 1943; he was the sole candidate.

Pro-fascist sympathies 
Just as in other South American countries, pro-Nazi and pro-fascist sympathies at this time were quite strong in the society and among military officers. After it entered World War II in 1941, the United States tried to exert some pressure on Morínigo to limit the influence of Axis supporters. He kept Paraguay neutral for most of the war. He only officially declared war against the Axis in February 1945, without sending any soldiers to fight.

A surge of German influence in the region and Argentina's pro-Axis leanings alarmed the United States, which sought to wean Paraguay away from German and Argentine influence. At the same time, the United States sought to enhance its presence in the region and pursued close cooperation with Brazil, Argentina's traditional rival. To this end, the United States provided to Paraguay sizable amounts of funds and supplies under the Lend-Lease Agreement, provided loans for public works, and gave technical assistance in agriculture and health care. The United States Department of State approved of closer ties between Brazil and Paraguay and especially supported Brazil's offer to finance a road project designed to reduce Paraguay's dependence on Argentina.

United States protests over German and Argentine activities in Paraguay fell on deaf ears. While the United States defined its interests in terms of resisting the fascist threat, Paraguayan officials believed their best interests lay in economic expediency and were reluctant to antagonize Germany until the outcome of the war was no longer in doubt. Many Paraguayans believed Germany was no more of a threat to Paraguay's sovereignty than the United States.

Much to the displeasure of the United States and Britain, Morínigo refused to act against German economic and diplomatic interests until the very end of the war. German agents had successfully converted many Paraguayans to the Axis cause. South America's first Nazi Party branch had been founded in Paraguay in 1931. German immigrant schools, churches, hospitals, farmers' cooperatives, youth groups, and charitable societies became active Axis backers. All of those organizations prominently displayed swastikas and portraits of Adolf Hitler.

Morínigo's regime was pro-Axis. Large numbers of Paraguayan military officers and government officials were openly sympathetic to the Axis. Among these officials was the national police chief, who named his son Adolfo Hirohito after the best-known Axis leaders. By 1941, the official newspaper El País had adopted an overtly pro-German stance. At the same time, the government strictly controlled pro-Allied labor unions. Police cadets wore swastikas and Italian insignia on their uniforms.

The December 1941 Japanese attack on Pearl Harbor and Germany's declaration of war against the United States gave the United States the leverage it needed, however, to force Morínigo to commit himself publicly to the Allied cause. Morínigo officially severed diplomatic relations with the Axis countries in 1942, although he did not declare war against Germany until February 1945. Nonetheless, Morínigo continued to maintain close relations with the heavily German-influenced Argentine military throughout the war and provided a haven for Axis spies and agents.

The outbreak of World War II eased Morínigo's task of ruling Paraguay while keeping the army happy, because it stimulated demand for Paraguayan export products, such as meat, hides, and cotton, and boosted the country's export earnings. More important, United States policy toward Latin America at this time made Paraguay eligible for major economic assistance. Paraguay received American financial help which was used for improving roads and other infrastructure projects.

Postwar liberalization
Pressure from the US for democratization swept South America after the war. On June 9, 1946, Morínigo dismissed Colonel Benitez Vera, the right-wing head of the army, and crushed a short uprising by Vera's supporters. He then created a civilian coalition government formed by Colorado Party members and leftist febreristas, followers of former dictator Rafael Franco and allowed some political freedoms, going so far as legalizing the Paraguayan Communist Party. Despite all this, in September 1946 he ordered suppression of opposition groups and used the Red Banner paramilitary group to attack the office of the Liberal newspaper El País.

Civil war of 1947
Feeling that Morínigo was favouring the right-wing Colorados, the febreristas made common cause with the Liberal Party and the Communist Party in the Civil War of 1947.

The relaxation of the dictatorship was used by political parties to assert their influence in state institutions. In January 1947 officers loyal to the Colorado Party gained control of the army, and on January 11 febreristas quit the government and called on the army to overthrow Morínigo, who responded by declaring a state of siege and arresting febreristas, Liberals and Communists.

On March 7 a bloody civil war started. Despite the fact that 80% of soldiers and 90% of officers were against him, Morínigo had the backing of Colorado party militias and Argentinian President Juan Peron; he managed to win a conflict that caused many thousand deaths and up to 300,000 people to flee as refugees. The future dictator Alfredo Stroessner was one of the few officers who remained loyal to Morínigo during the civil war. For the next 15 years, the Colorados were the only legal party in Paraguay.

Removal from power
On February 15, 1948, Morínigo organized presidential elections which were won by the only candidate allowed to run, Juan Natalicio González —leader of the Colorado Party's Red Banner faction — with whom he had reached agreement that in return for his support of Gonzalez for president, he could continue as army's commander-in-chief. To prevent this, on June 3 some Colorado Party loyalists under Felipe Molas López revolted and sent him into exile in Argentina. Supreme Court Chief Justice Juan Manuel Frutos was sworn in as interim president, serving the last two months of Morínigo's term until González was officially inaugurated on August 15, 1948.

References 

1897 births
1983 deaths
People from Paraguarí
Paraguayan people of Spanish descent
Paraguayan people of Guarani descent
Presidents of Paraguay
Paraguayan anti-communists
Leaders ousted by a coup
Paraguayan generals
Paraguayan military personnel of the Chaco War
World War II political leaders